Lidia Kopania-Przebindowska (born 12 May 1978, Koluszki, Poland) is the frontwoman of the musical group Kind of Blue. Kopania had previously represented Poland at the Eurovision Song Contest 2009, held in Moscow, Russia.

Biography
In 2003, Kopania has established cooperation with a band Kind of Blue. Their first joint album, entitled Beating The Morning Rush appeared in Germany at the end of 2004. Participated in the German music program The John Lennon Talent Award. In Poland, the first single of Kopania's band was a song "Pocałuj mnie".

In 2006 she released the album Intuicja, which included 16 pop songs in English and four in Polish. With this release came a CD single "It Must Be Love", which had been submitted for consideration to represent Poland in the Eurovision Song Contest 2007.

Kopania was the winner of TOPtrendy Festival 2006, organized by Telewizja Polsat, which included two tracks - a song written for a single "Sleep" and Abba's cover "The Winner Takes It All". Her next CD Przed świtem appeared in June 2008. Manufacturer album before dawn, which operates a single, Rozmawiać z tobą chcę is Jens Lueck, compositions written by Bernd Klimpel, Filip Sojka, Jens Lueck, Rob Hoffman. In contrast, for the text layer is responsible Lidia.

Eurovision Song Contest 2009
In February 2009, Kopania participated in Polish national selection for the Eurovision Song Contest 2009 with the ballad "I Don't Wanna Leave". She won second place in the jury vote and the first in the televoting, thereby winning the national selection and representing Poland at the Eurovision Song Contest 2009 in Moscow. Kopania competed in the second semi-final but failed to reach the final having placed 12th out of 19 with a total of 43 points.

Discography

Albums
 2006 : Intuicja
 2008 : Przed świtem

Singles
 1998 "Niezwykły dar"
 2006 "Sleep"
 2006 "Hold On"
 2007 "Twe milczenie nie jest złotem"
 2008 "Tamta Łza"
 2008 "Rozmawiać z tobą chce"
 2009 "I Don't Wanna Leave"
 2013 "Hold My Breath And Wait"
 2020 "W Pomiedzy"
 2020 "Faith Cannot Be Broken"
 2021 "Remedy"
 2021 "Push The Boundaries"
 2021 "Scars Are Beautiful"
 2022 "Why Does It Hurt"

Videos
 2006 "Sleep"
 2008 "Rozmawiać z tobą chcę"
 2009 "I Don't Wanna Leave"
 2013 "Hold My Breath And Wait"

References

External links

  
Official Fan Club (PL | EN) 

1978 births
Living people
People from Łódź East County
Eurovision Song Contest entrants for Poland
Eurovision Song Contest entrants of 2009
Polish pop singers
21st-century Polish singers
21st-century Polish women singers